Falguni Hamid is a Bangladeshi actress, playwright, director and producer. She served as the Director of Bangladesh Shishu Academy. She is the incumbent president of Bangladesh Cine-Journalist Association.

Career

Hamid completed master's in Bangla from the University of Dhaka. Hamid started her career as a journalist in "Banglar Bani". She was involved with journalism for 15 years. She passed the Bangladesh Television (BTV) audition in 1978 and joined the theatre troupe "Natyachakra". She performed in television drama serials in the 1980s.

Hamid is the owner of "Tele Real LTD", the first production house in Bangladesh. She ran the magazine "Shimontini", on women and children's issues.

Personal life
Hamid has been married to M Hamid since 1978. Together they have a daughter, Tonima Hamid, and a son, Prantar Hamid. Tonima is a television and stage actress.

In 2014, Hamid sought Bangladesh Awami League nomination for a parliamentary seat reserved for women.

Works
Films
 Buker Vitor Agun (1997)

Television – Own and daughter Tonima Hamid

Awards
 Sher-E-Bangla Smrity Award
 BACHSAS Award
 Drama Personality Award
 Kabita Parishad Award (2009)

References

External links

Living people
Bangladeshi television actresses
Bangladeshi stage actresses
Bangladeshi theatre directors
University of Dhaka alumni
Year of birth missing (living people)